The history of the Jews in Turkey ( or ;) covers the 2400 years that Jews have lived in what is now Turkey. There have been Jewish communities in Anatolia since at least the fifth century BCE and many Spanish and Portuguese Jews expelled from Spain by the Alhambra Decree were welcomed into the Ottoman Empire in the late 15th century, including regions now part of Turkey, centuries later, forming the bulk of the Ottoman Jews.

Today, the vast majority of Turkish Jews live in Israel, though Turkey itself still has a modest Jewish population.

History

Roman & Byzantine rule

According to the Hebrew Bible, Noah's Ark landed on the top of Mount Ararat, a mountain in eastern Anatolia, in Northern Kurdistan, near the present-day borders of Turkey, Armenia, and Iran. Josephus, Jewish historian of the first century, notes Jewish origins for many of the cities in Anatolia, though much of his sourcing for these passages is traditional. The New Testament has many mentions of Jewish populations in Anatolia: Iconium (now Konya) is said to have a synagogue in Acts of the Apostles 14:1, and Ephesus is mentioned as having a synagogue in Acts 19:1 and in Paul's Epistle to the Ephesians. The Epistle to the Galatians is likewise directed at Galatia, which once held an established Jewish population.

Based on physical evidence, there has been a Jewish community in Anatolia since the fourth century BCE, most notably in the city of Sardis. The subsequent Roman and Byzantine Empires included sizable Greek-speaking Jewish communities in their Anatolian domains which seem to have been relatively well-integrated and enjoyed certain legal immunities. The size of the Jewish community was not greatly affected by the attempts of some Byzantine emperors (most notably Justinian I) to forcibly convert the Jews of Anatolia to Christianity, as these attempts met with very little success. The exact picture of the status of the Jews in Asia Minor under Byzantine rule is still being researched by historians. Although there is some evidence of occasional hostility by the Byzantine populations and authorities, no systematic persecution of the type endemic at that time in western Europe (pogroms, the stake, mass expulsions, etc.) is believed to have occurred in Byzantium.

Jews arrived in Anatolia between the sixth century BCE and 133 BCE, when the Romans arrived. They were Romaniote Jews and first settled in Phrygia and Lydia. In 2020, a seventh-century synagogue was uncovered in Side

Ottoman era

The first synagogue linked to Ottoman rule is "Tree of Life" in Bursa, which passed to Ottoman authority in 1324. The synagogue is still in use, although the modern Jewish population of Bursa has shrunk to about 140 people.

The status of the Jews in the Ottoman Empire often hinged on the whims of the sultan. So, for example, while Murad III ordered that the attitude of all non-Muslims should be one of "humility and abjection" and that they should not "live near Mosques or tall buildings" or own slaves, others were more tolerant.

The first major event in Jewish history under Turkish rule took place after the Empire gained control over Constantinople. After Mehmed the Conqueror's conquest of Constantinople he found the city in a state of disarray. After suffering many sieges, the devastating sack of Constantinople by Crusaders in 1204 and the arrival of the Black Death pandemic in 1347, the city was a shadow of its former glory. Since Mehmed wanted the city as his new capital, he decreed its rebuilding.

In order to revivify Constantinople he ordered that Muslims, Christians and Jews from all over his empire be resettled in the new capital. Within months, most of the Empire's Romaniote Jews, from the Balkans and Anatolia, were concentrated in Constantinople, where they made up 10% of the city's population. At the same time, the forced resettlement, though not intended as an anti-Jewish measure, was perceived as an "expulsion" by the Jews. Despite this interpretation, Romaniotes would be the most influential community in the Empire for a few decades, until that position would be lost to a wave of Sephardi immigrants.

The number of Romaniotes was soon bolstered by small groups of Ashkenazi Jews that immigrated to the Ottoman Empire between 1421 and 1453. Among these immigrants was Rabbi Yitzhak Sarfati, a German-born Jew of French descent ( Sarfati "French"), who became Chief Rabbi of Edirne and wrote a letter inviting European Jewry to settle in the Ottoman Empire, in which he stated, "Turkey is a land wherein nothing is lacking," and asking, "Is it not better for you to live under Muslims than under Christians?"

The greatest influx of Jews into Anatolia Eyalet and the Ottoman Empire occurred during the reign of Mehmed the Conquerors's successor, Bayezid II (1481–1512), after the expulsion of the Jews from Spain, the Kingdom of Portugal, the Kingdom of Naples and the Kingdom of Sicily. The Sultan issued a formal invitation and refugees started arriving in the empire in great numbers. A key moment occurred in 1492, when more than 40,000 Spanish Jews fled the Spanish Inquisition. At that point in time, Constantinople's population was a mere 70,000 due to the various sieges of the city during the Crusades and the Black Death, so this historical event was also significant for repopulation of the city. These Sephardi Jews settled in Constantinople as well as Thessaloniki.

The Jews satisfied various needs in the Ottoman Empire: the Muslim Turks were largely uninterested in business enterprises and accordingly left commercial occupations to members of minority religions. They also distrusted the Christian subjects whose countries had only recently been conquered by the Ottomans and therefore it was natural to prefer Jewish subjects to which this consideration did not apply.

The Sephardi Jews were allowed to settle in the wealthier cities of the empire, especially in Rumelia (the European provinces, cities such as Constantinople, Sarajevo, Thessaloniki, Adrianople and Nicopolis), western and northern Anatolia (Bursa, Aydın, Tokat and Amasya), but also in the Mediterranean coastal regions (Jerusalem, Safed, Damascus, and Egypt). İzmir was not settled by Spanish Jews until later.

The Jewish population in Jerusalem increased from 70 families in 1488 to 1500 at the beginning of the 16th century. That of Safed increased from 300 to 2000 families and almost surpassed Jerusalem in importance. Damascus had a Sephardic congregation of 500 families. Constantinople had a Jewish community of 30,000 individuals with 44 synagogues. Bayezid allowed the Jews to live on the banks of the Golden Horn. Egypt Eyalet, especially Cairo, received a large number of the exiles, who soon outnumbered Musta'arabi Jews. Gradually, the chief center of the Sephardi Jews became Thessaloniki, where the Spanish Jews soon outnumbered coreligionists of other nationalities and, at one time, the original native inhabitants.

Although the status of the Jews in the Ottoman Empire may have often been exaggerated, it is undeniable that they enjoyed tolerance. Under the millet system they were organized as a community on the basis of religion alongside the other millets (e.g. Eastern Orthodox millet, Armenian Apostolic millet, etc.). In the framework of the millet, they had a considerable amount of administrative autonomy and were represented by the Hakham Bashi, the Chief Rabbi. There were no restrictions in the professions Jews could practice analogous to those common in Western Christian countries. There were restrictions in the areas Jews could live or work, but such restrictions were imposed on Ottoman subjects of other religions as well.

Like all non-Muslims, Jews had to pay the haraç "head tax" and faced other restrictions in clothing, horse riding, army service etc., but they could occasionally be waived or circumvented. Jews who reached high positions in the Ottoman court and administration include Mehmed the Conqueror's Minister of Finance (Defterdar) Hekim Yakup Paşa, his Portuguese physician Moses Hamon, Murad II's physician İshak Paşa and Abraham de Castro, master of the mint in Egypt.

During the Classical Ottoman period (1300–1600), the Jews, together with most other communities of the empire, enjoyed a certain level of prosperity. Compared with other Ottoman subjects, they were the predominant power in commerce and trade as well in diplomacy and other high offices. In the 16th century especially, the Jews were the most prominent under the millets, the apogee of Jewish influence could arguably be the appointment of Joseph Nasi to sanjak-bey (governor, a rank usually only bestowed upon Muslims) of Naxos. Also in the first half of the 17th century the Jews were distinct in winning tax farms, Haim Gerber describes it: "My impression is that no pressure existed, that it was merely performance that counted."

Friction between Jews and Turks was less common than in the Arab territories. Some examples: During the reign of Murad IV (1623–40), the Jews of Jerusalem were persecuted by an Arab who had purchased the governorship of that city from the governor of the province. Under Mehmed IV (1649–87), the 1660 destruction of Safed occurred.

An additional problem was Jewish ethnic divisions. They had come to the Ottoman Empire from many lands, bringing with them their own customs and opinions, to which they clung tenaciously, and had founded separate congregations. Another tremendous upheaval was caused when Sabbatai Zevi proclaimed to be the Messiah. He was eventually caught by the Ottoman authorities and when given the choice between death and conversion, he opted for the latter. His remaining disciples converted to Islam too. Their descendants are today known as Dönmeh.

The history of the Jews in Turkey in the 18th and 19th century is principally a chronicle of decline in influence and power; they lost their influential positions in trade mainly to the Greeks, who were able to "capitalize on their religio-cultural ties with the West and their trading diaspora". An exception to this is Daniel de Fonseca, who was chief court physician and played a certain political role. He is mentioned by Voltaire, who speaks of him as an acquaintance whom he esteemed highly. Fonseca was involved in negotiations with Charles XII of Sweden.

Ottoman Jews held a variety of views on the role of Jews in the Ottoman Empire, from loyal Ottomanism to Zionism. Emmanuel Carasso, for example, was a founding member of the Young Turks, and believed that the Jews of the Empire should be Turks first, and Jews second.

As mentioned before, the overwhelming majority of the Ottoman Jews lived in Rumelia. As the Empire declined however, the Jews of these region found themselves under Christian rule. The Bosnian Jews for example came under Austro-Hungarian rule after the occupation of the region in 1878, the independence of Greece, Bulgaria and Serbia further lowered the number of Jews within the borders of the Ottoman Empire.

Early republic

The Jewish population of Ottoman Empire had reached nearly 200,000 at the start of the 20th century. The territories lost between 1829 and 1913 to the new Christian Balkan states significantly lowered this number.

The troubled history of Turkey during the 20th century and the process of transforming the old Ottoman Empire into a secular nation state after 1923, however, had a negative effect on the size of all remaining minorities, including the Jews.

After 1933, a new law put into effect in Nazi Germany for mandatory retirement of officials from non-Aryan race. Thus, the law required all the Jewish scientists in Germany to be fired. Unemployed scientists led by Albert Einstein formed an association in Switzerland. Professor Schwartz, the general secretary of the association, met with the Turkish Minister of Education in order to provide jobs for 34 Jewish scientists in Turkish universities especially in Istanbul University.

However, the planned deportation of Jews from East Thrace and the associated anti-Jewish pogrom in 1934 was one of the events that caused insecurity among the Turkish Jews. Before the start of the pogroms, Ibrahim Tali Öngören, the Inspectorate General of the Trakya Inspectorate General, suggested to remove the Jews from the region as they presented an economic threat to the Muslim population. 

The effect of the 1942 Varlık Vergisi ("Wealth Tax") was solely on non-Muslims – who still controlled the largest portion of the young republic's wealth – even though in principle it was directed against all wealthy Turkish citizens, it most intensely affected non-Muslims. The "wealth tax" is still remembered as a "catastrophe" among the non-Muslims of Turkey and it had one of the most detrimental effects on the population of Turkish Jews. Many people unable to pay the exorbitant taxes were sent to labor camps and in consequence about 30,000 Jews emigrated. The tax was seen as a racist attempt to diminish the economic power of religious minorities in Turkey.

World War II

During World War II, Turkey was officially neutral although it maintained strong diplomatic relations with Nazi Germany. During the war, Turkey denaturalized 3,000 to 5,000 Jews living abroad; 2,200 and 2,500 Turkish Jews were deported to extermination camps such as Auschwitz and Sobibor; and several hundred interned in Nazi concentration camps. When Nazi Germany encouraged neutral countries to repatriate their Jewish citizens, Turkish diplomats received instructions to avoid repatriating Jews even if they had could prove their Turkish nationality. Turkey was also the only neutral country to implement anti-Jewish laws during the war. More Turkish Jews suffered as a result of discriminatory policies during the war than were saved by Turkey. Although Turkey has promoted the idea that it was a rescuer of Jews during the Holocaust, this is considered a myth by historians. This myth has been used to promote Armenian genocide denial.

Turkey served as a transit for European Jews fleeing Nazi persecution during the 1930s and 1940s.

A memorial stone with a bronze epitaph was inaugurated in 2012, as the third of individual country memorials (after Poland and the Netherlands) at the Bergen-Belsen concentration camp for eight Turkish citizens killed during the Nazi regime in the said camp. The Turkish Ambassador to Berlin, Hüseyin Avni Karslıoğlu stated in an inauguration speech that Germany set free 105 Turkish citizens, held in camps, after a mutual agreement between the two countries, and these citizens returned to Turkey in April 1945, although there is no known official record for other Turkish Jews who may have died during the Holocaust in Nazi Germany.

According to Rıfat Bali, Turkish authorities bear some responsibility for the Struma disaster, killing about 781 Jewish refugees and 10 crew, due to their refusal to allow the Jewish refugees on board to disembark in Turkey. William Rubinstein goes further, citing British pressure on Turkey not to let Strumas passengers disembark, in accordance with Britain's White Paper of 1939 to prevent further Jewish immigration to Palestine.

Emigration from Turkey to Israel

When the Republic of Turkey was established in 1923, Aliyah was not particularly popular amongst Turkish Jewry; migration from Turkey to Palestine was minimal in the 1920s. As in other Muslim-majority countries, discrimination later became the main "push" factor that encouraged emigration from Turkey to Palestine.

Between 1923 and 1948, approximately 7,300 Jews emigrated from Turkey to Mandatory Palestine. After the 1934 Thrace pogroms following the 1934 Turkish Resettlement Law, immigration to Palestine increased; it is estimated that 521 Jews left for Palestine from Turkey in 1934 and 1,445 left in 1935. Immigration to Palestine was organized by the Jewish Agency and the Palestine Aliya Anoar Organization. The Varlık Vergisi, a capital tax which occurred in 1942, was also significant in encouraging emigration from Turkey to Palestine; between 1943 and 1944, 4,000 Jews emigrated.

The Jews of Turkey reacted very favorably to the creation of the State of Israel. Between 1948 and 1951, 34,547 Jews immigrated to Israel, nearly 40% of the Turkish Jewish population at the time. Immigration was stunted for several months in November 1948, when Turkey suspended migration permits as a result of pressure from Arab countries.

In March 1949, the suspension was removed when Turkey officially recognized Israel, and emigration continued, with 26,000 emigrating within the same year. The migration was entirely voluntary, and was primary driven by economic factors given the majority of emigrants were from the lower classes. In fact, the migration of Jews to Israel is the second largest mass emigration wave out of Turkey, the first being the Population exchange between Greece and Turkey.

After 1951, emigration of Jews from Turkey to Israel slowed perceptibly.

In the mid-1950s, 10% of those who had moved to Israel returned to Turkey. A new synagogue, the Neve Şalom, was constructed in Istanbul in 1951. Generally, Turkish Jews in Israel have integrated well into society and are not distinguishable from other Israelis. However, they maintain their Turkish culture and connection to Turkey, and are strong supporters of close relations between Israel and Turkey.

Democratic Party period 

On the night of 6/7 September 1955, the Istanbul Pogrom was unleashed. Although primarily aimed at the city's Greek population, the Jewish and Armenian communities of Istanbul were also targeted to a degree. The damage caused was mainly material (a complete total of over 4,000 shops and 1,000 houses – belonging to Greeks, Armenians and Jews – were destroyed) it deeply shocked minorities throughout the country.

Later period

The present size of the Jewish community was estimated at 17,400 in 2012 according to the Jewish Virtual Library. The vast majority, approximately 95%, live in Istanbul, with a community of about 2,500 in İzmir and other much smaller groups located in Adana, Ankara, Bursa, Çanakkale, Edirne, Iskenderun and Kirklareli. Sephardi Jews make up approximately 96% of Turkey's Jewish population, while the rest are primarily Ashkenazi Jews and Jews from Italian extraction. There is also a small community of Romaniote Jews and the community of the Constantinopolitan Karaites who are related to each other.

The city of Antakya is home to ten Jewish families, many of whom are of Mizrahi Jewish extraction, having originally come from Aleppo, Syria, 2,500 years ago. Figures were once higher but families have left for Istanbul, Israel and other countries.

Turkish Jews are still legally represented by the Hakham Bashi, the Chief Rabbi. Rabbi Ishak Haleva is assisted by a religious council made up of a Rosh Bet Din and three Hahamim. 35 lay counselors look after the secular affairs of the community and an executive committee of fourteen, the president of which must be elected from among the lay counselors, runs the daily affairs. The Istanbul community also has 16 synagogues and well kept and guarded cemetery.

In 2001, the Jewish Museum of Turkey was founded by the Quincentennial Foundation, an organisation established in 1982 consisting of 113 Turkish citizens, both Jews and Muslims, to commemorate the 500th anniversary of the arrival of the Sephardic Jews to the Ottoman Empire.

The Turkish-Jewish population is experiencing a population decline, and has dwindled to 17,000 in a few years from an original figure of 23,000. This is due to both large-scale immigration to Israel out of fear of antisemitism, but also because of natural population decline. Intermarriage with Turkish Muslims and assimilation have become common, and the community's death rate is more than twice that of its birth rate.

As of 2021, the Jewish population in Turkey is around 14,000. As of 2022, the Jewish population in Turkey is around 14,500.

Antisemitism

According to researchers at Tel Aviv University, antisemitism in the media and books was creating a situation in which young, educated Turks formed negative opinions against Jews and Israel. Moreover, violence against Jews has also occurred. In 2003, an Istanbul dentist was murdered in his clinic by a man who admitted that he committed the crime out of antisemitic sentiment. In 2009, a number of Jewish students suffered verbal abuse and physical attacks, and a Jewish soldier in the Turkish Army was assaulted.

The Neve Shalom Synagogue in Istanbul has been attacked three times. First on 6 September 1986, Arab terrorists gunned down 22 Jewish worshippers and wounded 6 during Shabbat services at Neve Shalom. This attacked was blamed on the Palestinian militant Abu Nidal. The Synagogue was hit again during the 2003 Istanbul bombings alongside the Beth Israel Synagogue, killing 20 and injuring over 300 people, both Jews and Muslims alike. Even though a local Turkish militant group, the Great Eastern Islamic Raiders' Front, claimed responsibility for the attacks, police claimed the bombings were "too sophisticated to have been carried out by that group", with a senior Israeli government source saying: "the attack must have been at least coordinated with international terror organizations".

Traditionally, aliyah from Turkey to Israel has been low since the 1950s. Despite the antisemitism and occasional violence, Jews felt generally safe in Turkey. In the 2000s, despite surging antisemitism, including antisemitic incidents, aliyah remained low. In 2008, only 112 Turkish Jews emigrated, and in 2009, that number only rose to 250. However, in the aftermath of the 2010 Gaza flotilla raid, antisemitism in Turkey increased and became more open, and it was reported that the community was also subjected to economic pressure. A boycott of Jewish businesses, especially textile businesses, took place, and Israeli tourists who had frequented the businesses of Turkish Jewish merchants largely stopped visiting Turkey. As a result, the number of Turkish Jews immigrating to Israel increased. By September 2010, the Jewish population of Turkey had dropped to 17,000, from a previous population of 23,000 Currently, the Jewish community is feeling increasingly threatened by extremists. In addition to safety concerns, some Turkish Jews also immigrated to Israel to find a Jewish spouse due to the increasing difficulty of finding one in the small Turkish Jewish community. In 2012, it was reported that the number of Jews expressing interest in moving to Israel rose by 100%, a large number of Jewish business owners were seeking to relocate their businesses to Israel, and that hundreds were moving every year.

In October 2013, it was reported that a mass exodus of Turkish Jews was underway. Reportedly, Turkish Jewish families are immigrating to Israel at the rate of one family per week on average, and hundreds of young Turkish Jews are also relocating to the United States and Europe.

Turkey and Israel

Turkey was among the first countries to formally recognize the State of Israel. Turkey and Israel have closely cooperated militarily and economically. Israel and Turkey have signed a multibillion-dollar project to build a series of pipelines from Turkey to Israel to supply gas, oil and other essentials to Israel. In 2003 the Arkadaş Association was established in Israel. The Arkadaş Association is a Turkish–Jewish cultural center in Yehud, aiming to preserve the Turkish-Jewish heritage and promote friendship (Arkadaş being the Turkish word for Friend) between the Israeli and Turkish people. In 2004, the Ülkümen-Sarfati Society was established by Jews and Turks in Germany. The society, named after Selahattin Ülkümen and Yitzhak Sarfati, aims to promote intercultural and interreligious dialogue and wants to inform the public of the centuries of peaceful coexistence between Turks and Jews.

Diaspora

The various migrations outside of Turkey has produced descendants of Turkish Jews in Europe, Israel, United States, and Canada. Today, there are still various synagogues that maintain Jewish-Turkish traditions.

The Sephardic Synagogue Sephardic Bikur Holim in Seattle, Washington was formed by Jews from Turkey, and still uses Ladino in some portions of the Shabbat services. They created a siddur called Zehut Yosef, written by Hazzan Isaac Azose, to preserve their unique traditions.

In recent years, several hundred Turkish Jews, who have been able to prove that they are descended from Jews expelled from Portugal in 1497, have emigrated to Portugal and acquired Portuguese citizenship.

Notable Turkish Jews

 Ishak Alaton, co-founder of Alarko Holding
 Aaron Alfandari, writer
 Solomon Eliezer Alfandari, Sephardic rabbi
 Seyla Benhabib, political theorist
 Can Bonomo, musician from Izmir who represented Turkey at the Eurovision Song Contest 2012 in Baku, Azerbaijan 
 Abraham Salomon Camondo, Ottoman-Italian financier and philanthropist; patriarch of the Camondo family
 Elijah Capsali, first Hakham Bashi of the Ottoman Empire
 Moses Capsali, Hakham Bashi
 Isaac Carasso, Ottoman Jewish entrepreneur and businessman
 Mendy Chitrik, rabbi of the Ashkenazi community, chairman of Alliance of Rabbis in Islamic States
 Uzeyir Garih, co-founder of Alarko Holding
 Fernando Gerassi, Turkish artist
 Françoise Giroud, politician
 Umut Güzelses, Turkish-Israeli soccer player
 Ishak Haleva, current Hakham Bashi of Turkey
 Israel Hanukoglu, biochemist
 Barzillai ben Baruch Jabez, talmudist
 Victoria Kamhi, pianist
 Emanuel Karasu, Salonica-born Ottoman statesman
 Hila Klein, Israeli-American YouTuber; mother is of Turkish-Jewish descent
 Morris Levy, music industry executive
 Linet, Turkish-Israeli singer
 Leandra Medine, author and blogger; father, Mois Medine, is of Turkish-Jewish descent
 Elijah Mizrachi, Hakham Bashi
 Darío Moreno, İzmir-born musician
 Chaim Nahum, Hakham Bashi
 Doña Gracia Mendes Nasi
 Joseph Nasi, Portuguese Ottoman trader and the first non-Muslim to be appointed to the rank of Sanjak-bey (governor)
 Abraham Palacci, grand rabbi of Izmir
 Joseph Palacci, rabbi of Izmir
 Rahamim Nissim Palacci, grand rabbi of Izmir
 Haim Palachi, grand rabbi of Izmir
 Emin Pasha, physician, naturalist, and governor 
 Mosè Piccio, lexicographer
 Haim Saban, Israeli-American TV producer; mother was of Turkish-Jewish descent
 Berry Sakharof, Israeli rock guitarist, singer, songwriter and producer
 Silvio Santos, media tycoon and television host
 Izak Senbahar, American real estate developer
 Lenore Skenazy, activist and founder of the Free-Range kids movement
 Joseph Taitazak, Spanish-born Ottoman rabbi and Kabbalist
 Sabbatai Zevi, Sephardic rabbi and Kabbalist

See also

References

Further reading

External sources

 Levine, Rabbi Menachem, The History of the Jews of Turkey, Aish.com
 
 "Hayalet Evler: Türk-Yahudi Mimarisinden Örnekler", Beyaz Arif Akbas, Ekim 2012, YGY, 
 In particular on the history of Istanbul Jewry after the fall of the Byzantine Empire, see M. Rosen, Studies in the History of Istanbul Jewry, 1453-1923 (Diaspora, 2), Turnhout, 2015
An-Ottoman-Odyssey-A-Rabbi-Rediscovers-Turkeys-Jews-Past-and-Present 16 August 2021 Chabad.com

 
 
Romaniote Jews topics
Israel–Turkey relations
Turkey
Turkish people of Spanish descent